This is a list of artists who have recorded for Roc-A-Fella Records.

A star (*) denotes an artist who no longer records for the label.

A
 Amil*

B
 Foxy Brown*
 Neef Buck*
 Joe Budden*
 Beyonce

C
 Cam'ron*  
 Christión*

D
 The Diplomats*
 DJ Clue*

E
 Héctor el Father*
 Aztek Escobar*

F
 Freeway*

J
 Jadakiss*
 Jay-Z
 Jim Jones*
 Just Blaze*
 J. Cole*
 Juelz Santana*

K
 Kanye West

M
 M.O.P*
 Teairra Mari*
 Mecca*
 Memphis Bleek

N
 N.O.R.E.*

O
 Ol' Dirty Bastard*

P
 Jay Park*
 Peedi Peedi*

R
 Rell*
 Samantha Ronson*
 Rick Vocals*

S
 Juelz Santana*
 Beanie Sigel*
 Omillio Sparks*
 State Property*

T
 Tru Life*

U
 Uncle Murda*

W
 Nicole Wray*

Y
 Young Chris*
 Young Gunz* 
 Young Steff*

See also
 Roc-La-Familia

Roc-A-Fella Records